Baccio Lomi (circa 1550–1595) was an Italian painter of the late-Renaissance period, active mainly in town of Pisa, in the region of Tuscany of Italy.

Biography
He may have initially been trained by his father, Giovanni Battista Lomi, a Florentine jeweller. He acquired Pisan citizenship in 1572. Two of his nephews, and pupils, were  Orazio Gentileschi (born 1562) and Aurelio Lomi. Baccio mainly painted religious altarpieces and portraits.

References

1550s births
1595 deaths
People from Pisa
16th-century Italian painters
Italian male painters
Painters from Tuscany